Vantage Airport Group (or Vantage, formerly Vancouver Airport Services or YVRAS) is an airport management, development and investment company with 10 airports in Canada, the United States, Cyprus, The Bahamas and Jamaica.

History

Vantage Airport Group (Vantage) was formed in 1994 as Vancouver Airport Services (YVRAS), a subsidiary of Vancouver Airport Authority.  Vancouver Airport Authority and Vantage Airport Group have a strategic partnership agreement that allows for the sharing of best practices and expertise. YVRAS was part of a consortium that was going to privatize Midway Airport in Chicago. In April 2009 the deal fell through.

Vantage led the LaGuardia Gateway Partners consortium bid to operate and redevelop LaGuardia Airport's Terminal B. On May 28, 2015, the Port Authority of New York and New Jersey voted to move forward on the Central Terminal Building Redevelopment Project, announcing LaGuardia Gateway Partners as preferred proposer.

On June 1, 2016, LaGuardia Gateway Partners assumed the lease of Terminal B, commencing a $5.1B terminal redevelopment plan, the largest aviation infrastructure P3 in the U.S.

In March 2018, Vantage and RXR Realty were selected by JetBlue Airways as the preferred development partner for the airline's terminals at John F. Kennedy International Airport (JFK).

Vantage is wholly owned by Corsair Capital Infrastructure Partners. On February 4, 2019, Corsair announced the closing of a fundraising initiative for Vantage.

JetBlue Technology Ventures announced on April 25, 2019 that Vantage had joined its International Partnership Program to scout new startups and technologies to improve the travel experience.

Airports

Vantage provides management services to various airports owned by Vantage or via a consortium:

United States
LaGuardia Airport, Queens, New York
responsible for operations and redevelopment of Terminal B
 Midway Partnership, Midway Airport, Chicago
a consortium (composed of Vantage, SSP America, Hudson Group) responsible for operations and redevelopment of Midway's concessions program 
Canada
North Peace Regional Airport, Fort St. John, British Columbia
 owned via North Peace Airport Services Limited
John C. Munro Hamilton International Airport, Hamilton, Ontario
 acquired through purchase of Tradeport International Corporation 2007
Kamloops Airport, Kamloops, British Columbia
 owned via Kamloops Airport Limited
Greater Moncton Romeo LeBlanc International Airport, Moncton, New Brunswick
Caribbean
 Sangster International Airport, Montego Bay, Jamaica
 Leading stakeholder of the operating consortium, MBJ Airports Ltd (25.5% stake), Abertis is also a partner.
 Lynden Pindling International Airport, Nassau, The Bahamas
 Europe
 Larnaka International Airport, Cyprus
 Paphos International Airport, Cyprus

In 2006 the then Vancouver Airport Services was part of a French-led group, Hermes Airports, that won a tender to upgrade Larnaca International Airport and Paphos International Airport.

See also
 Vancouver International Airport
 Greater Toronto Airports Authority and Toronto Port Authority
 Regina Airport Authority
 Edmonton Airports
 Halifax International Airport Authority

References 

Aerospace companies of Canada
Airport operators of Canada
Airport operators of the United States
Transport in British Columbia
1994 establishments in British Columbia
Transport in Jamaica
Aviation in the United Kingdom
Transport in Cyprus
Transport in New Brunswick
Transport in Ontario
Canadian companies established in 1994